The Microbiology Society (previously the Society for General Microbiology) is a learned society based in the United Kingdom with a worldwide membership based in universities, industry, hospitals, research institutes and schools. It is the largest learned microbiological society in Europe. Interests of its members include basic and applied aspects of viruses, prions, bacteria, rickettsiae, mycoplasma, fungi, algae and protozoa, and all other aspects of microbiology. Its headquarters is at 14–16 Meredith Street, London. The Society's current president is Prof. Gurdyal S. Besra. The Society is a member of the Science Council.

History
The society was founded on 16 February 1945 as the Society for General Microbiology. Its first president was Alexander Fleming. The Society's first academic meeting was in July 1945 and its first journal, the Journal of General Microbiology (later renamed Microbiology), was published in 1947. A symposium series followed in 1949, and a sister journal, the Journal of General Virology, in 1967. The society purchased its own headquarters in Reading in 1971, after initially sharing accommodation with the Biochemical Society in London. In 2014 the Society moved to Charles Darwin House, London, sharing the premises with several other learned societies. In 2015, the Society changed its name to the Microbiology Society, after its members voted in favour of the change. In 2019 the Society moved to its new headquarters at 14–16 Meredith Street, London.

Activities
The Society currently organises a large Annual Conference and a number of smaller Focused Meetings, which cover a specific microbiology discipline. It publishes a magazine, Microbiology Today (formerly SGM Quarterly), and academic journals in virology and microbiology:
Microbiology 
International Journal of Systematic and Evolutionary Microbiology
Journal of General Virology
Journal of Medical Microbiology
Microbial Genomics
Access Microbiology
JMM Case Reports (now closed)

Society Prizes
The Microbiology Society awards a range of prizes in recognition of significant contributions to microbiology.

In 2009, the Society announced the Society for General Microbiology Prize Medal, awarded annually to a microbiologist of international standing whose work has had a far-reaching impact beyond microbiology. The first medal was awarded to Stanley Prusiner. The recipient of the Prize Medal gives a lecture based on the work for which the award has been made, which is usually published in a Society journal. In 2015, the prize was renamed the Microbiology Society Prize Medal.

The Marjory Stephenson Prize is awarded annually for an outstanding contribution of current importance in microbiology. The winner receives £1000 and gives a lecture on his/her work at a Society meeting. The lecture is usually published in a society journal. Marjory Stephenson was the second president of the Society (1947–1949) and a distinguished pioneer of chemical microbiology.

The Fleming Prize Lecture is awarded annually to recognise outstanding research in any branch of microbiology by a microbiologist in the early stages of his/her career. Sir Alexander Fleming was the first President of the Society (1945–1947) and received a Nobel Prize for his discovery of penicillin.

The Sir Howard Dalton Young Microbiologist of the Year Competition is presented annually to a Society member who is a PhD student or early-career postdoctoral researcher. The competition is judged on the participants' oral or poster presentations at Society conferences. The prize was renamed in 2009 in honour of the late Howard Dalton.

The Peter Wildy Prize Lecture is awarded annually for contribution to microbiology education or communication. It is named after Peter Wildy, a virologist and was established in 2001.

The Microbiology Outreach Prize was established in 2009.

Presidents
Source: Microbiology Society

References

External links 
 
 Microbiology Society - education website

1945 establishments in the United Kingdom
British biology societies
Learned societies of the United Kingdom
Microbiology organizations
Organisations based in the London Borough of Camden
Science and technology in London
Scientific organizations established in 1945